Alexander Stewart Provincial Park is a nature reserve in McNab/Braeside, Renfrew County, Ontario, Canada, about  west of the centre of Arnprior. This nature reserve contains a hardwood forest of several species including maple, American beech, basswood, blue-beech, and bur oak. The subsurface is clay silt, a remnant of the ice age Champlain Sea.

The property was bought in 1860 by the eponymous Alexander Stewart, and donated by his children to the province in 1966.

The park, located at the northwest intersection of Maple Bend Road and Russett Drive, is a non-operating park, meaning there are no facilities or services.

References

External links

Provincial parks of Ontario
Protected areas of Renfrew County
Nature reserves in Ontario
Protected areas established in 2003
2003 establishments in Ontario